Azospira is a genus in the phylum Pseudomonadota (Bacteria). It has two members, namely Azospira oryzae and Azospira restricta.

See also
 Bacterial taxonomy
 Microbiology

References 

Bacteria genera
Rhodocyclaceae